Caglesville is an unincorporated community in Center Township, Pope County, Arkansas, United States. The community was named for N. P. Cagle, a local mill operator.

References

Unincorporated communities in Pope County, Arkansas
Unincorporated communities in Arkansas